South River High School is a public high school located in Edgewater, Maryland, United States, a suburb of the state capital, Annapolis. It lies directly next to Central Middle School. It was built in 1978 due to overcrowding at Arundel High School and Southern High School. It is the primary school for high school students from Edgewater, Mayo, Davidsonville, Riva, and a small portion of Harwood.

Students

South River High School only has one feeder middle school, which is Central Middle School. Central Middle School has 4 feeder elementary schools: Central, Davidsonville, Edgewater, and Mayo. Prior to the opening of Crofton High School in 2020, half of the Crofton Middle School feeder system was also included in the South River High School feeder system. South River High School students from the Crofton area who were in grade 9 during the 2019-2020 school year were relocated to Crofton High School in the fall of 2020. However, because Crofton High only served grades 9 and 10 during the 2020-2021 school year and will only serve grades 9, 10, and 11 during the 2021-2022 school year, Crofton area students who were in grades 11 and 12 in the fall of 2020 remained at South River High School.

It received a Blue Ribbon in education. South River has a great reputation throughout Maryland and is known as one of the best high schools in Anne Arundel County. In 2013, Newsweek ranked South River as one of the top 30 high schools in Maryland, and one of the top 1,000 in the country.

The class of 2009 graduated with over $8.5 million in scholarships, and 5 senior students received Scholarships for Scholars from the Anne Arundel County Government. Members of the school's faculty have received awards from the Karen Gaffney Foundation, an organization promoting community service and excellence in special education programs.

South River is Co-Ed and handicap accessible.

The student body is 79% White, 7% Hispanic and Latino, 6% Black, 3% Asian, and 4% of South River students identify as being of two or more races. 11% of students receive free and reduced price meals.

Athletics 

South River competes in the Anne Arundel County Division of Maryland's 4A subdivision.
South River has won many state championships, most recently in 2018 with girl's Varsity Lacrosse. In 2001, 2004, 2016 and 2017, Varsity Field Hockey won the state championships. South River football won a county championship in the 2019-2020 season going undefeated in the regular season. The Seahawks last appeared in the playoffs in 2019 losing in the 2nd round to their rival, the Arundel Wildcats. South River won a state baseball championship in 2013, their first state championship ever and only their third regional championship. South River wrestling won their first regional championship in 2017.

STEM magnet program
South River features the STEM magnet program (Science, Technology, Engineering, and Mathematics). It was introduced in the fall of 2009, and students from other Anne Arundel County public high school districts can apply to the magnet program and attend South River if they get accepted by means of a lottery system and are assigned to a middle school that is included in South River’s STEM feeder system. South River is one of two high schools in Anne Arundel County featuring the STEM program, the other being North County High School in Glen Burnie.

Controversies

Suspension of football coach 
On August 16, 2010, a South River student varsity football player suffered a serious back injury during a passing drill which confined the player to a wheelchair for at least six months. After another student alerted the school’s football coach Steve Erxleben of the injury, Erxleben instructed players to continue with practice, claiming the injury did not appear to be severe at the time. According to the player injured, Erxleben denied the student athlete ice and later watched as they were carried off the field by two teammates. According to a report following the incident, then-principal William Myers was alerted of the injury by the player’s father four days after the incident. Steve Erxleben was suspended from coaching at South River indefinitely on August 24, 2010 after failing to follow administrative practices reporting the incident. After an investigation that concluded before the season began, the Anne Arundel County Public Schools superintendent at the time, Kevin Maxwell, announced Erxleben would remain suspended for the first three games of the season until September 20, 2010 for failure to report the incident. In December 2010, Erxleben resigned from his coaching position at South River. He returned several years later and was named the Baltimore Ravens High School Coach of the Week of the 2021 fall season.

2018 bathroom assault 
On September 12, 2018, School Resource Officers and administration staff were made aware of a fight in one of the men’s bathrooms where three juvenile males were assaulting another juvenile male. After the students refused to stop assaulting the student, one School Resource Officer deployed oleoresin capsicum spray and began to arrest the three students. One female student entered the bathroom in an attempt to stop the arrest. The female student and the assaulter sprayed with oleoresin capsicum were taken to the hospital for decontamination. The three male juveniles were charged with second-degree assault, resisting arrest, and affray, while the female student was charged with hindering a lawful arrest, and disorderly conduct.

2020 sexual abuse case 
In 2020, Meredith Susan Barry Martin, a biology teacher at South River, was arrested and charged with five counts of sex abuse of a minor, eight counts of a fourth-degree sex offense involving a person in a position of authority, and two counts of perverted practice, after Martin was reported to be having sexual encounters with a teenage student. Police responded to an initial report of inappropriate contact between a teacher and a student on January 30, 2019, where the Anne Arundel County Board of Education removed Martin from having further contact with children. She remained in her reassigned position until February 5, 2020 when she was taken into police custody.

References

External links
South River High School Official Website
AACPS Webpage for South River High School

Public high schools in Maryland
Schools in Anne Arundel County, Maryland
Educational institutions established in 1978
1978 establishments in Maryland